St. Theodosius Nunatak (‘Nunatak Sv. Teodosiy’ \'nu-na-tak sve-'ti te-o-'do-siy\) is the mostly ice-free ridge extending 1.9 km in northeast-southwest direction and 1 km wide, rising to 430 m on the west side of Havre Mountains in northern Alexander Island, Antarctica. It surmounts Lennon Glacier to the north and Pipkov Glacier to the south-southeast.

The feature is named after the Bulgarian cleric and hermit St. Theodosius of Tarnovo (1300-1363), in connection with the settlement of Teodosievo in Northern Bulgaria.

Location
British mapping in 1991.

Maps
 British Antarctic Territory. Scale 1:250000 topographic map. Sheet SR19-20/5. APC UK, 1991
 Antarctic Digital Database (ADD). Scale 1:250000 topographic map of Antarctica. Scientific Committee on Antarctic Research (SCAR). Since 1993, regularly upgraded and updated

Notes

References
 Bulgarian Antarctic Gazetteer. Antarctic Place-names Commission. (details in Bulgarian, basic data in English)
 St. Theodosius Nunatak. SCAR Composite Gazetteer of Antarctica

External links
 St. Theodosius Nunatak. Copernix satellite image

Nunataks of Alexander Island
Bulgaria and the Antarctic